Tim de Vries (born 10 August 1978) is a Dutch Para-cyclist. He represented the Netherlands in the 2016 and 2020 Summer Paralympics.

Career
De Vries represented the Netherlands in the 2016 and 2020 Summer Paralympics. In the latter, he won the bronze medal in the men's road race H5 event.

References

1978 births
Living people
Dutch male cyclists
Cyclists at the 2016 Summer Paralympics
Cyclists at the 2020 Summer Paralympics
Medalists at the 2020 Summer Paralympics
Paralympic medalists in cycling
Paralympic bronze medalists for the Netherlands